Eugène Ehrhart (29 April 1906 – 17 January 2000) was a French mathematician who introduced Ehrhart polynomials in the 1960s. Ehrhart received his high school diploma at the age of 22. He was a mathematics teacher in several high schools, and did mathematics research on his own time. He started publishing in mathematics in his 40s, and finished his PhD thesis at the age of 60.

Selected publications
.

References
A Tribute to Eugène Ehrhart, Philippe Clauss, University of Strasbourg.

External links
Mathematicians who were late learners?-list – MathOverflow

1906 births
2000 deaths
20th-century French mathematicians
University of Strasbourg alumni